Ryan High School may refer to:

Archbishop Ryan High School, in Philadelphia, Pennsylvania
Billy Ryan High School, in Denton, Texas
Father Ryan High School, in Nashville, Tennessee
Bishop Ryan High School, in Minot, North Dakota